At least two ships of the United States Navy have borne the name USS Chehalis.

 , a Patapsco-class gasoline tanker acquired by the U.S. Navy for the dangerous task of transporting gasoline to warships in the fleet, and to remote Navy stations.
 , an Asheville-class gunboat of the U.S. Navy.

Sources

United States Navy ship names